Langenes is a village in Troms og Finnmark, Norway.

References

Villages in Finnmark